Players and pairs who neither have high enough rankings nor receive wild cards may participate in a qualifying tournament held one week before the annual Wimbledon Tennis Championships.

Seeds

  Dudi Sela (first round)
  Jack Sock (first round)
  João Sousa (qualifying competition)
  Wayne Odesnik (qualified)
  Jiří Veselý (second round)
  Denis Kudla (qualified)
  Jan-Lennard Struff (qualified)
  Tim Smyczek (qualifying competition)
  Illya Marchenko (second round)
  Dušan Lajović (first round)
  Michał Przysiężny (qualified)
  Rhyne Williams (qualifying competition)
  Go Soeda (qualified)
  Matthias Bachinger (first round)
  Marc Gicquel (qualified)
  Teymuraz Gabashvili (qualified)
  Matteo Viola (first round)
  Yūichi Sugita (first round)
  Simon Greul (first round)
  Olivier Rochus (qualifying competition, retired, lucky loser)
  Julian Reister (qualified)
  Somdev Devvarman (first round)
  Ruben Bemelmans (qualifying competition)
  Flavio Cipolla (qualifying competition)
  Daniel Muñoz de la Nava (qualifying competition)
  Guido Andreozzi (second round)
  Bobby Reynolds (qualified)
  Florent Serra (second round)
  Jimmy Wang (qualified)
  Marco Chiudinelli (first round)
  Michael Berrer (qualifying competition)
  Paul Capdeville (second round)

Qualifiers

  Stéphane Robert
  Bastian Knittel
  Julian Reister
  Wayne Odesnik
  Dustin Brown
  Denis Kudla
  Jan-Lennard Struff
  Matt Reid
  Jimmy Wang
  James Duckworth
  Michał Przysiężny
  Bobby Reynolds
  Go Soeda
  Alex Kuznetsov
  Marc Gicquel
  Teymuraz Gabashvili

Lucky loser
  Olivier Rochus

Qualifying draw

First qualifier

Second qualifier

Third qualifier

Fourth qualifier

Fifth qualifier

Sixth qualifier

Seventh qualifier

Eighth qualifier

Ninth qualifier

Tenth qualifier

Eleventh qualifier

Twelfth qualifier

Thirteenth qualifier

Fourteenth qualifier

Fifteenth qualifier

Sixteenth qualifier

External links

 2013 Wimbledon Championships – Men's draws and results at the International Tennis Federation

Men's Singles Qualifying
Wimbledon Championship by year – Men's singles qualifying